Mukandi Lal (14 October 1885 - 10 January 1982) was an Indian advocate, judge, freedom fighter, politician, writer and art critic from Garhwal.

Early life  
Mukandi Lal was born in Patali village, Malla Nagpur patti in Chamoli, Garhwal in the later Indian state of Uttarakhand.

His early education was in Pauri and Almora, followed by higher education in Allahabad, Calcutta and Oxford.  As a student of Muir central college, Allahabad, Lal accompanied Lala Lajpat Rai in his tour of Kumaon and Garhwal during the famine of 1913. He studied law at Oxford University. His education at Oxford was sponsored by Ghanananad Khanduri, a local philanthropist.

Career  
Lal was an advocate in the Allahabad High Court beginning in 1919 and served as a Judge of the High Court in Tehri-Garhwal State. 

He was the founder and editor of the newspaper Tarun Kumaun (Young Kumaun). In 1921, Garhwali and Kumaoni youth rallied against the coolie beggar system and Lal met Garhwali students from Varanasi on the issue.

Activist 
Lal represented Kumaon along with Pandit Govind Ballabh Pant in the Convention of the United Provinces Congress in November 1920, prior to the Nagpur session during which it was decided that the propaganda for Non-cooperation movement would also be carried out in Kumaon.  Lal represented Garhwal.

Mukandi Lal was the legal counsel of the soldiers of 39 Garhwal Rifles accused of mutiny during the Peshawar Incident (Qissa Khwani Bazaar massacre) in 1930, when they refused to open fire against unarmed satyagrahis of Khudai Khidmatgar protesting the unlawful arrest of Khan Abdul Ghaffar Khan. He is credited for saving the 'Hero of Peshawar' - platoon commander Chandra Singh - from death-penalty.

Art critic and author 
Lal became an authority on Pahari paintings, especially the Garhwal School of Painting and one its prolific artists - Mola Ram. He authored the book Garhwal Paintings published by the Department of Publications in 1968. He wrote several books. He was awarded the fellowship of State Lalit Kala Akademi, Uttar Pradesh in 1972 and his work was recognised by the All India Fine Arts & Crafts Society in 1978.

References 

People from Chamoli district
1885 births
1982 deaths